Sceloporus occidentalis occidentalis is a subspecies of the western fence lizard. The common name for this taxon is the northwestern fence lizard. This lizard occurs in the state of Washington in the United States.

See also

 Coast Range fence lizard
 Island fence lizard

Line notes

References
 ITIS report: Sceloporus occidentalis occidentalis (1996)
 C. Michael Hogan (2008) "Western fence lizard (Sceloporus occidentalis)", Globaltwitcher, ed. Nicklas Stromberg 

Sceloporus